Merseyside Police is the territorial police force responsible for policing Merseyside in North West England. The service area is 647 square kilometres with a population of around 1.5 million.  As of September 2017 the service has 3,484 police officers, 1,619 police staff, 253 police community support officers, 155 designated officers and 208 special constables. The force is led by Chief Constable Serena Kennedy.

History
The service came into being in 1974 when Merseyside was created, and is a successor to the Liverpool and Bootle Constabulary (itself formed in 1967 by a merger of the Liverpool City Police with the Bootle Borough Police), along with parts of Cheshire Constabulary and Lancashire Constabulary.   A proposal to merge the force with the Cheshire Constabulary to form a strategic police force was made by the Home Secretary on 6 February 2006 but later abandoned.

Merseyside maintained in 2018 it could lose 300 officers, reducing the force to 3,172.  This would be a 31% reduction since 2010 when there were 4,616 officers.

Chief constables
19741975  Sir James Haughton
19761989  Sir Kenneth Oxford
19891998  Sir James Sharples
19982004  Sir Norman Bettison
20042009  Sir Bernard Hogan-Howe
October 2009  January 2010  Bernard Lawson (Acting Chief Constable)
February 2010  June 2016  Sir Jonathan Murphy
July 2016  April 2021  Andy Cooke
April 2021  present  Serena Kennedy

Officers killed in the line of duty

The Police Roll of Honour Trust and Police Memorial Trust list and commemorate all British police officers killed in the line of duty. Since its establishment in 1984, the Police Memorial Trust has erected 50 memorials nationally to some of those officers.

The following officers of Merseyside Police are listed by the Trust as having died during the time of their service, since the force was established in 1974:

PC Francis Knight, 1974 (killed in a motorcycle crash returning home from duty in stormy weather)
PC Raymond Davenport, 1981 (fatally injured when dragged by a stolen car while attempting to arrest the driver; posthumously awarded the Queen's Commendation for Brave Conduct)
PC Norman Harold Jones, 1983 (killed when struck by a car while at the scene of a motorway accident)
PC James William Byers, 1983 (killed when struck by a car while at the scene of a motorway accident)
PC William Marshall, 1986 (died as a result of internal injuries received during rioting in 1981)
PC Mark Paul Shelton, 1987 (fatally injured in a vehicle collision on a police motorcycle course)
Sergeant Douglas Charles Beggs, 1987 (killed in a vehicle collision leaving the Mersey Tunnel while going off duty)
PC John Shevlin, 1997 (died following two years in a coma after his police car crashed)
PC Gary Clarke, 2001 (killed when he was struck by a car while cycling home from work)
PC David Thomas Shreeve, 2005 (killed in a motorway collision on a police motorcycle training course)
PC Neil Doyle, 2014 (killed off duty during police Christmas party after an assault in Liverpool city centre)
PC David Phillips, 2015 (died as a result of internal injuries received when hit by a stolen car he was attempting to stop in Wallasey)
PC Paul Briggs, 2017 (killed due to a car travelling on the wrong side of the road which struck his motorcycle as he reported to duty in 2015, receiving extensive injuries from which he never recovered)

Governance
Merseyside Police is overseen by the Merseyside Police and Crime Commissioner (PCC). , the elected PCC is Emily Spurrell. The PCC is scrutinised by the Merseyside Police and Crime Panel, made up of elected councillors from the local authorities in Merseyside. Before November 2012, the Merseyside Police Authority was the police governance.

Organisation
Until 2017, Merseyside Police was divided into five Basic Command Units (BCUs), one for each of the Local Authority areas that make up Merseyside.  The BCUs were, 

 Liverpool (following a merger of Liverpool North and Liverpool South in April 2015)
 Sefton
 Wirral
 St Helens
 Knowsley

In 2017, following a force restructure the Basic Command Unit structure was disbanded in favour of a functional structure.

Departments 
There are many different departments that makeup Merseyside Police. These include the Matrix Disruption Team and, formerly, the Anti-Social Behaviour Taskforce.  Former Chief Constable Andy Cooke was concerned about budget cuts. He stated, "The impact of the proposed changes on police officer pensions [forcing police forces to pay pensions out of their budget] cannot, and should not, be underestimated. It is incumbent on me to ensure that those who will make the final decisions in relation to the pension changes understand the crippling impact these changes will have on policing".

Matrix Disruption Team
The Matrix Disruption Team, led by a chief inspector, consists of syndicates made up of inspectors, sergeants and constables. Each syndicate works with other Matrix units to provide the force with a level two response to gun crime, faction-based criminality and cash-in-transit robberies.  These officers are specifically trained to deal with a variety of disorder situations, ranging from small protests to large-scale crowd disorder.

The Matrix team used vans with the slogan "Matrix - A force to be reckoned with" on the left of the vehicle.

Public order is one of the main functions of the department and therefore all officers receive the required training and are subjected to rigorous training scenarios. Matrix has a number of baton gun trained specialist officers: two sergeants and ten constables.
The Matrix team also have specialist search teams and rope access teams.

Mounted Section

Merseyside Police Mounted Section has a long history. It is the oldest Provincial Mounted section, formed in 1886 as part of Liverpool City Police. It is an integral part of the Operational Support Unit, and is based at Greenhill Road, Allerton, Liverpool.

The mounted section is an operational specialist section with a staff of one inspector, two sergeants, 14 constables, six civilian stable hands and 14 horses.

The section provides neighbourhoods with an alternative response to reduce the incidents of crime and disorder, using an intelligence-led approach, a tactical option in relation to public order & major incidents, as well as high visibility patrolling at football matches, rugby matches, race meetings and other special events.

Dog Section
Each area within the force has its own allocation of dogs and handlers who work alongside the neighbourhood patrol section.

There are currently 70 general-purpose dogs in the force area, 16 of these have extended training for deployment alongside colleagues from the firearms department.

Merseyside Police, like most forces, rely on the German Shepherd Dog for their general purpose police dog work. All general-purpose work involves the dogs' outstanding sense of smell, several hundred times superior to that of a human. The dog handler takes advantage of the dogs' natural abilities to search for and detect human scent.

The force also utilises both English Springer Spaniels and Labradors for their specialist detection roles; drugs, firearms, explosives and cadaver. These are the preferred breeds as they have extremely high energy levels and are able to search for long periods. The force currently operates 29 specialist dogs to carry out these detection roles.

Air Support Group (closed) 
Today, all air support to policing in England and Wales is provided by the National Police Air Service (NPAS).

Prior to this, the Merseyside Police Air Support Group was set up in late 1989 in response to an increase in the number of high-speed vehicle pursuits that were occurring after burglaries had been committed outside of the force area. The unit was disbanded in July 2011 amid budget cuts with the loss of its helicopter and Woodvale base.

The early days saw the unit based at Liverpool Airport, but due to rising costs, the unit moved to RAF Woodvale and purpose-built accommodation.

Prior to the establishment of NPAS, Merseyside shared Air Support with Cheshire, Greater Manchester, North Wales and Lancashire as the North West Regional Air Support Group.

Anti-Social Behaviour Taskforce (closed) 
The former Anti-Social Behaviour Taskforce dealt with people who were alleged to be creating anti-social behaviour. They also made raids for drugs and known offenders who were alleged to be lowering the standard of life for the community.

The unit was initially known as Axis, but the use of this name was dropped around the end of 2007. It was publicly announced on 9 July 2010 that as a result of budget reductions, this department would be closed and they disbanded in early 2011.

Equipment

Vehicles

Merseyside Police has a wide fleet of vehicles. Scientific Support vehicles are equipped with a high-intensity roof-mounted light which allows forensic examinations to be completed in all lighting conditions. In late 2012, Merseyside Police took delivery of three OVIK Pangolin armoured public order vehicles, as used by the Police Service of Northern Ireland.
These vehicles will be used from public order to counter-terrorist operations.

Uniform

 Merseyside Police are one of the few British police forces to have retained the traditional white shirt and black tie or chequered cravat as part of the everyday patrol uniform. Officers on foot patrol wear the custodian helmet in the comb style or bowler hat. A fluorescent overcoat is usually worn at night or when high visibility is required, otherwise a black waterproof overcoat with reflective markings is worn. Officers travelling in vehicles wear the flat cap or bowler and tend not to wear an overcoat. All officers are provided with stab vests.

Officers in the specialist units wear tactical uniforms of the sort often used by everyday patrol officers in other forces, including combat trousers and black wicking polo shirts. Mounted Section officers also have a full dress uniform for ceremonial occasions.

Collaborations
Merseyside Police is a partner in the following collaborations:
 North West Police Underwater Search & Marine Unit
 North West Motorway Police Group

See also
Law enforcement in the United Kingdom
List of law enforcement agencies in the United Kingdom
Table of police forces in the United Kingdom
Mersey Tunnels Police
Port of Liverpool Police

References

External links

 Merseyside Police at HMICFRS

Police
Police forces of England
1974 establishments in England
Organizations established in 1974